Radyo Türkü also known as TRT Türkü is a radio network of Turkish Radio and Television Corporation (TRT). It is specialized on Turkish folkloric music. The network was established in 2009.

Technical details
TRT Türkü is broadcast both on satellite (DBS) and on FM transmitters. Although there are many FM transmitter stations only those stations which are mainly directed to province capitals are shown below.

References

Turkish radio networks
Turkish music
Turkish Radio and Television Corporation